School Khanoana is a village of Bhawana located on the Jhang Chiniot road. Its name is after the name of Sial (tribe) "Khanoana" residents of the area of Jhang, Chiniot and Bhawana. Talib Hussain Dard a well-known Punjabi folk singer was also born in this village.

References 

Chiniot District
Villages in Chiniot District